Mohamed Ali Yousfi (born March 3, 1950 in Béja, Tunisia) is a Tunisian writer and translator.

Life
After obtaining his master's degree in philosophy and social sciences, he completed his postgraduate studies at the Lebanese University.

His first novel, published in 1992, was titled The Time for Elves, and won the prize for best Arabic novel Tawkit Al Binka-Al Naked Prize. His second novel, Sun Tiles, was published five years later, and won the prize for best novel of Tunisia 1997COMAR D'OR Edition 1998.

Publications
Poetry
 Edge of the earth
 The Night of ancestors
 A sixth woman for the senses

Novels
 The kingdom of al okhaydhar
 Yesterday, Beirut
 Dentella
 Thresholds of paradise

Translations
 Emile Cioran, Fragments chosen
 Georges Bataille, Theory of Religion
 Dai Sijie, Balzac and the Little Chinese Seamstress
 Guy de Maupassant, From Tunis to Kairouan
 Roger Icart, The French Revolution on the Screen
 Eric Leguèbe, A Century of French Cinema
 Trails wind (choice of poems) by Pierre Emmanuel, René Char, Alain Bosquet and Eugène Guillevic

Novels (in Arabic)
 Riwayet
 Atabat al janna

References

2-
Un romancier tunisien: Mohammed Ali Yousfi

3-
arabworldbooks

4-
Tunisian-Novelists-Abdelwahab-Bouraoui-Mohamed Ali Yousfi

5-
MODERN TUNISIAN LITERATURE

6
Fontaine-Articles

7
poetasdelmundo

External links
 His blog: Carma كرمة
MODERN TUNISIAN LITERATURE
Un romancier tunisien: Mohammed Ali Yousfi
voixvivesmediterranee
File:Tunisian-Novelists

1948 births
Living people
20th-century Tunisian poets
Tunisian novelists
Tunisian translators
Translators to Arabic
Lebanese University alumni
People from Béja
21st-century Tunisian poets